The Kapiolani Community College Cactus Garden is a small botanical garden specializing in cactus. It is located on the Kapiolani Community College campus, near Parking Lot C, at 4303 Diamond Head Road, Honolulu, Hawaii. The garden was created by Moriso Teraoka in 1988.

See also
 List of botanical gardens in the United States

References

External links
The Hawai'i Memory Project: Cactus and Succulent Garden

Botanical gardens in Hawaii
Tourist attractions in Honolulu
Geography of Honolulu
Protected areas established in 1988
1988 establishments in Hawaii
Cactus gardens